Savin' the Honky Tonk is the eleventh studio album by American country music artist Mark Chesnutt. His first album for the Vivaton! label, it features the singles "The Lord Loves the Drinkin' Man", "I'm a Saint", and "A Hard Secret to Keep", which reached #34, #33, and #59, respectively, on the Hot Country Songs charts.

Three of this album's tracks were previously recorded by other artists. "Beer, Bait, and Ammo" was originally recorded by its writer, Kevin Fowler, on his 2000 album of the same name, and later by Sammy Kershaw on his 2003 album I Want My Money Back. Fowler also recorded "The Lord Loves the Drinkin' Man" on his 2004 album Loose, Loud & Crazy. "Would These Arms Be in Your Way" was originally recorded by Keith Whitley on his 1988 album Don't Close Your Eyes.

The people pictured on the album cover include all of Chesnutt's road band and crew.

Track listing

Production
All tracks produced By Jimmy Ritchey with assistance by Mike Griffith.
Recorded at The Money Pit and The Sound Kitchen by Clarke Schreicher, assisted by Erik Hellerman and J.C. Monterrosa.
Overdubs recorded by Erik Hellerman at Fox Ridge Studios.
Mixed by Clarke Schreicher and Rich Hanson at Loud Studios.
Mastered by Bob Ludwig at Gateway Mastering Studios, Inc.

Personnel
As listed in liner notes.
Eddie Bayers - drums
Mark Chesnutt - lead vocals
Larry Franklin - fiddle
Paul Franklin - steel guitar, Dobro
Wes Hightower - background vocals
John Barlow Jarvis - piano
B. James Lowry - acoustic guitar
Brent Mason - electric guitar
Jimmy Ritchey - tic tac bass, acoustic guitar, electric guitar
John Wesley Ryles - background vocals
Lee Ann Womack - background vocals on "Would These Arms Be in Your Way"
Glenn Worf - bass guitar

Chart performance

References

2004 albums
Mark Chesnutt albums
Albums produced by Jimmy Ritchey